The Jaguari River is a Brazilian river in the states of São Paulo and Minas Gerais.

The Jaguari is a tributary of the Piracicaba River.

See also
 List of rivers of Minas Gerais

References
 Map from Ministry of Transport
 Rand McNally, The New International Atlas, 1993.

Rivers of São Paulo (state)
Rivers of Minas Gerais